David Lawrence Nicholson (August 29, 1939 – February 25, 2023) was an American professional baseball outfielder who played in Major League Baseball for the Baltimore Orioles ( and ), Chicago White Sox (–), Houston Astros and Atlanta Braves. Nicholson was known for his towering, although infrequent, home runs.

Nicholson was born in St. Louis, Missouri, where he graduated from Southwest High School. He was signed as an amateur by the Orioles to a bonus contract, reportedly worth $105,000, on January 26, 1958.

Baseball career
In , his second season in the Baltimore farm system, Nicholson batted .298 for their Aberdeen Pheasants affiliate (managed by Earl Weaver) with 35 home runs, tied for the lead in the Class C  Northern League. 

The following year saw Nicholson promoted all the way to Triple-A, and his MLB debut on May 24, 1960 at age 20. Facing the White Sox at Comiskey Park, he went hitless with one walk in four plate appearances. He remained on the Baltimore roster all season and hit five home runs, but struck out 55 times in 133 trips to the plate. 

He spent  back in the minor leagues, mainly in the Double-A Southern Association, before being given a full-year audition with the  Orioles. He played in 97 games, starting 80 of them in the outfield, but he batted only .173 with nine homers and 76 strikeouts in 202 plate appearances. On May 5, 1962, Nicholson was the last Orioles' batter of a no-hitter pitched by Bo Belinsky of the Los Angeles Angels, popping out to third base. 

In January 1963, Baltimore traded Nicholson, future Baseball Hall of Fame pitcher Hoyt Wilhelm, and infielders Ron Hansen and Pete Ward to the Chicago White Sox for Hall of Fame shortstop Luis Aparicio and outfielder Al Smith. Over his career, he struck out 573 times in 1,662 plate appearances, once every 3.4 times he came to the plate.

On May 6, 1964, during the first game of a doubleheader at Comiskey Park, Nicholson hit a home run off Moe Drabowsky of the Kansas City Athletics that either bounced off the left-field roof or entirely cleared it. The ball was found across the street. Howie Roberts, the White Sox' traveling secretary, told the Associated Press: "If it had landed on the roof, it would have a visible bruise on it. It cleared the roof." Nicholson homered three times in that doubleheader. Nicholson hit just 13 home runs for the 1964 season.

After the  season, the White Sox traded Nicholson and catcher Bill Heath to the Houston Astros for pitcher Jack Lamabe and cash. The Astros traded Nicholson and Bob Bruce to the Atlanta Braves for Eddie Mathews, Arnold Umbach, and a player to be named later after the 1966 season.

For his MLB career, he played in 538 games and had 1,419 at bats, 184 runs, 301 hits, 32 doubles, 12 triples, 61 home runs, 179 RBI, six stolen bases, 219 walks, 540 total bases, four sacrifice hits, 12 sacrifice flies, and seven intentional walks. He compiled a .212 batting mark, .318 on-base percentage and a .381 slugging percentage.

Death
Nicholson died in Carmi, Illinois, on February 25, 2023, at the age of 83.

References

External links

1939 births
2023 deaths
Aberdeen Pheasants players
Amarillo Gold Sox players
American expatriate baseball players in Nicaragua
Atlanta Braves players
Austin Braves players
Baltimore Orioles players
Baseball players from St. Louis
Chicago White Sox players
Dublin Orioles players
Houston Astros players
Knoxville Smokies players
Little Rock Travelers players
Major League Baseball left fielders
Miami Marlins (IL) players
Omaha Royals players
Richmond Braves players
Rochester Red Wings players
Wilson Tobs players